Hudugaru ( Boys) is a 2011 Kannada-language drama film directed by K. Madesh, starring Puneeth Rajkumar, Srinagar Kitty, Yogesh and Radhika Pandit in the lead roles. The film, which is a remake of the successful 2010 Tamil film Naadodigal, was produced by Parvathamma Rajkumar, with V. Harikrishna having composed the soundtrack and Satya Hegde was the cinematographer. The film released on 5 May 2011 and performed well at the box office similar to Puneeth's previous film Jackie.

The plot focuses on a trio who attempt to unite their friend with his lover against the wishes of all families involved, and at a heavy cost to themselves, only to realize that the lovers separate after a short while.

The film earned Puneeth Rajkumar Filmfare and SIIMA Best Actor Award in Kannada.

Plot
Three youths – Prabhu, Chandru, and Siddesh (Puneeth Rajakumar, Srinagara Kitty and Yogesh respectively) aspiring for government jobs, and to settle in Dubai are struck with bad luck in life when Sudhir (Vishal Hegde), a best friend of Prabhu falls in love with the daughter of a business tycoon.

Prabhu decides to kidnap the businessman's daughter with his close friends Chandru and Siddesh, so that his friend Sudhir (son of former MP) is happy. While kidnapping, things go badly for the three friends - Prabhu gets hit badly on his forehead, Chandru loses his right leg and Siddesh becomes deaf.

It is not just that in the life of trios. The destiny is very bad when they are back to their native place. Prabhu loses his love for someone, Siddesh is sent out from the home, Chandru losing a leg finds Pavitra (Prabhu's sister) for his life.

The story takes an interesting turn when the marriage breaks out of a quarrel between Sudhir and Sushma. The three return to the same place where they were brutally wounded and question the lovers about the separation.

Cast

Release
The film released on 5 May 2011 in around 130 plus cinema screens all over Karnataka.

Soundtrack

V. Harikrishna's music for the movie have been widely appreciated. The lyrics are written by Jayanth Kaikini, Yogaraj Bhat and V. Nagendra Prasad. The song "Sambo Siva" from the original Tamil film was retained.

Reception

Critical response 

Shruti Indira Lakshminarayana from Rediff.com scored the film at 3 out of 5 stars and says "Radhika Pandit plays a small yet significant role. She is expressive in emotional scenes. Abhinaya, who was part of Nadodigal, does a neat job here. Rangayana Raghu is as good as he can get. Sadhu Kokhila does a decent job too. Hudugaru largely remains faithful to the original. Yet it is a one time watch. More so if you haven't watched the original". A critic from The Times of India scored the film at 4 out of 5 stars and wrote "Puneet Rajkumar has displayed an excellent performance, especially in the climax. Srinagara Kitty and Rangayana Raghu have breathed life into their characters. It's Yogesh who walks away with praise for an extraordinary performance. Radhika Pandit and Ramya Barna are impressive. Guruprasad's dialogues and Sathya Hegde's cinematography too deserve praise. The film also has some catchy tunes by V Harikrishna". B S Srivani from Deccan Herald wrote "As this is Puneet’s home production, vulgarity is kept at bay - the ‘item song’ is presented well. Hudugru is a chak-a-chak movie offering entertainment with a message. Whether these hudugru manage to impress friends and lovers remains to be seen. A critic from Bangalore Mirror wrote  "But it is not easy to convey the same intensity that the writer intended. Each re-telling dilutes the story, despite its best intentions. Even if making money is the prime motive , the paying audience at least gets the value for what they pay".

References

External links 
 

2011 films
2010s Kannada-language films
Films shot in Chitradurga
Kannada remakes of Tamil films
Films scored by V. Harikrishna
Indian buddy drama films
2011 masala films
Indian action drama films
Films shot in Karnataka
2011 action drama films
2010s buddy drama films